Bruce McCall (born May 10, 1935) is a Canadian author and illustrator, best known for his frequent contributions to The New Yorker.

Life and career
Born and raised in Simcoe, Ontario, McCall was fascinated by comic books and showed an early aptitude for drawing fantastical flying machines, blimps, bulbous-nosed muscle cars and futuristic dioramas.

In his memoir, Thin Ice (1997), McCall recounted that he was never good at physical activity as a boy, but could count on his mother to encourage his creativity.  
   
Without any serious technical training, McCall began his illustration career drawing cars for Ford Motor Company in Toronto in the 1950s. After several decades in advertising, he sought opportunities elsewhere in the publishing industry.

He went to New York City, and was hired by National Lampoon, where he made a name for himself as an artist with intelligent and whimsical humor.  McCall also spent a brief period writing sketches for Saturday Night Live.  A large proportion of McCall's work has a retrofuturistic theme.

McCall has illustrated magazine covers, regularly appearing in The New Yorker, Car and Driver, and other magazines. He has been a contributor to the magazine since 1979.
 
McCall is also a humourist, and has written essays on some of the social ironies of modern life. He writes frequently for the "Shouts & Murmurs" section of The New Yorker.

McCall lives on the Upper West Side of New York near Central Park.

Selected bibliography

Books
 (1982) Zany Afternoons 
 (1993) Sit!: The Dog Portraits of Thierry Poncelet, text by Bruce McCall 
 (1997) Thin Ice (memoir) 
 (1998) Viagra Nation: The Definitive Guide to Life in the New Sexual Utopia 
 (2001) Sit!: Ancestral Dog Portraits 
 (2001) The Last Dream-o-Rama 
 (2003) New York to the World Mural 8th Ave and 34th street
 (2003) All Meat Looks Like South America 
 (2008) Marveltown 
 (2009) 50 Things to Do with a Book 
 (2013) This Land Was Made for You and Me (But Mostly Me): Billionaires in the Wild (with David Letterman) 
 (2020) How Did I Get Here?

Articles

External links 

 McCall's The New Yorker profile

Notes 

1935 births
Canadian cartoonists
Canadian male essayists
Canadian humorists
Canadian people of Scottish descent
Living people
The New Yorker cartoonists
Writers from Ontario
People from Norfolk County, Ontario
Canadian expatriate journalists in the United States
National Lampoon people
20th-century Canadian essayists
20th-century Canadian male writers
21st-century Canadian essayists
21st-century Canadian male writers